North Medford is the name of some places in the United States of America:

A neighborhood in Medford, Massachusetts
A neighborhood in Medford, Oregon
North Medford High School